Sandra is a village in Põhja-Sakala Parish, Viljandi County, Estonia. It has a population of 28 (as of 2009). Sandra is located in the Soomaa National Park. Due to large wetland areas being included in its boundaries, Sandra is the largest village by area in Estonia with 173 km² (larger than the area of Tallinn).

References

Villages in Viljandi County